Onyeka Akumah (born 21 October 1984) is a technology entrepreneur with focus on the transportation, agriculture, real estate, and media sectors. He is popularly known as the founder of Treepz Inc. Prior to founding his company in 2019, Onyeka Akumah was  the CEO of Farmcrowdy. He is credited to have been involved in the success of various tech and e-commerce companies in Africa where he held positions and contributed to their growths.

Early life and education 

Onyeka was born in Lagos State, and just before he was 2 years old, his parents relocated to Sokoto State, North-west Nigeria where he then did his Primary and Secondary School education. Onyeka earned his Bachelor's degree at the Sikkim Manipal University India where he graduated with a Grade A or First Class Honours in Applied Information Technology.

Career 

Onyeka ventured into entrepreneurship at a very young age, building startups even while he was still in the University recording successes and failures as he grew. After obtaining his first degree, Onyeka started his work experience with British Council as a Webmaster before going on to join Deloitte as the E-Marketing Coordinator for East, West and Central Africa. In 2010, he was the Online Marketing manager for Wakanow, then later had a stint with GTB to launch the SME Market Hub Onyeka is an e-commerce expert whose experience span top e-commerce companies such as Rocket Internet owned Jumia, Konga and Travelbeta leading their marketing and commercial activities. He is the Co-founder of Farmcrowdy, Plentywaka, Crowdyvest and RentSmallSmall. He resigned as CEO of Farmcrowdy in 2021 and is currently the CEO of Treepz (formerly Plantywaka). Was rank as top 10 Nigeria entrepreneur by Vanguard (Nigeria) alongside Uche Pedro , Seun Osewa, Anthony Ejefoh, Linda Ikeji and Temie Giwa-Tubosun. In October 2021, he was interviewed by Peace Hyde for his Forbes Africa Feature, where he spoke about his entrepreneurial journey. He was also featured  on Techcrunch where he spoke about African Start-Ups and Global Expansion.

On 2 March 2021, Onyeka resigned as CEO of Crowdyvest following a 100% sale of the business and Tope Omotolani was then appointed as CEO after she led a total acquisition of the company.

Treepz 
In September 2019, after an unfriendly bus transportation experience, Onyeka along with his co-founders Johnny Enagwolor, Oluseyi Afolabi and John Shaibu founded Treepz. During its rebranding process in September 2021, the company needed a more globally acceptable name, hence the change from Plentywaka to Treepz Inc. Treepz Inc is building Africa’s shared mobility platform offering commuters convenience, safety, and comfort on their daily commute. With  operations in Nigeria, Ghana and Uganda, Treepz has moved over 800,000 riders. Treepz Inc is set to disrupt the transportation sector with  services such as shared daily rides. Travel rides and now ticketing solutions. In December 2021, Treepz partnered with 53-year-old licensed shuttle bus company, CMS Taxi and Motor Nigeria Limited (CMS T&M), to digitise transportation for 1.6 million customers annually. They operate in the Central Business District of Lagos including Marina, Lagos Island, Victoria Island, Ikoyi and Lekki areas of Lagos State, with buses and minivans.

Farmcrowdy 

In November 2016, Onyeka, together with his co-founders Ifeanyi Anazodo, Akindele Philips, Christopher Abiodun, and Temitope Omotolani founded Farmcrowdy Limited, an agricultural digital platform connecting small scale farmers to investors with the goal of boosting the food production in Nigeria. Farmcrowdy, took off very fast, receiving its first angel investment of $60,000 a month after launch and in 2017, got a $1 million seed investment at the Techstars Atlanta Accelerators Programme. Today, the company has grown to a team of 55 individuals who have worked with over 25,000 rural farmers across 16 states in Nigeria including Kano, Niger, Nasarrawa, Ogun, Oyo, Osun, Edo, Akwa-Ibom, Lagos, Plateau, Kaduna, Adamawa, Niger, Kwara, Abuja, Sokoto, and Benue. Farmcrowdy is described by the Vice President of Nigeria, Professor Yemi Osinbajo as the company creating the new wealth in Agriculture and was later honoured with the National Productivity Order of Merit by President of Nigeria, Muhammadu Buhari.
In August 2019, Oyo State announced a partnership with Farmcrowdy to onboard 50,000 rural farmers in Oyo State. He noted the aim of FarmCrowdy at a briefing held at the main office in Lekki, Lagos in 2019. He said “We are establishing this new aggregate outfit as a subsidiary of Farmcrowdy to drive the growth of agriculture not just in Nigeria but on the continent. We have also managed to use the resources we were able to gather from both investors and supporters to put together in the business, to drive food production on the continent. Our aim for doing this is to do all the things that will make a farmers life better in the country. However, this does not in any way affect Farmcrowdy’s operations rather; it will make it better and boost the agric value chain of the country.”

Personal life 

Onyeka lives in Lagos, Nigeria. When he is not doing business or investing in startups, he enjoys speaking and teaching at various events and workshops.

Awards and recognition 
 (2022) Internet Entrepreneur of the Year Award - Business Insider Africa Awards.
 (2021) African Leadership Persons of the Year - African Agricultural Champion of the Year 2020
(2020) Ranked 24th in The Top 50 African Disruptors – The Africa Report 
 (2020) 50 African Innovators to Watch by Global Shakers 
 (2020) Top 10 Nigerian CEOs Under 40 Years 
 (2020) Entrepreneur of the Year 2019 at the GAGE Awards 
 (2019) The 100 Most Outstanding Individuals in Africa – The Africa Report
 (2019) 100 Most Influential Africans of 2019 – New African
 (2019) 26th Most Influential Young Person in Nigeria
 (2019) JCI Ten Outstanding Young Persons Of Nigeria
 (2018) Top 5 Outstanding Entrepreneurs in Nigeria
 (2018) Quartz List of Africa's 30 Innovators in 2018
 (2018) 100 Most Influential Young Persons in West African Under 40 for 2018
 (2018) Imperial Integrated Project- Award of Honor 2018
 (2018) Upgrade Africa Award of Excellence 2018
 (2018) Nigeria Technology Awards – Tech Entrepreneur of the Year
 (2017) Top 20 Young Entrepreneurs to Watch in Africa by the African Youth Forum in Egypt
 (2017) Nigerian Technology Awards – Start-up CEO of the Year 2017
 (2017) Impact Award 2017 in Agriculture
 (2015) Nigeria Technology Awards – Digital Marketing Personality of the Year 2015
 (2013) 1st runner up  – National Youth Merit Award in Innovation
 (2010) 3rd Best Website Designer for 2009 in the National Web Design Competition organized by the Federal Ministry of Youth Development in Nigeria
 (2009) Brown Heart Charity Award for Young Role Models under 30
 (2002) Delta State Scholarship for Academic Excellence

References

External links
 Official website

1984 births
Living people
Igbo businesspeople
21st-century Nigerian businesspeople
Nigerian company founders
People from Sokoto
Nigerian expatriates in India
Nigerian farmers
Nigerian venture capitalists
Businesspeople from Lagos
Nigerian chief executives